Northeastern University (NU or NEU) is a private research university with its main campus in Boston. Established in 1898, the university offers undergraduate and graduate programs on its main campus as well as satellite campuses in Charlotte, North Carolina; Seattle, Washington; San Jose, California; Oakland, California; Portland, Maine; and Toronto and Vancouver in Canada. In 2019, Northeastern purchased the New College of the Humanities in London, England. The university's enrollment is approximately 19,000 undergraduate students and 8,600 graduate students. It is classified among "R1: Doctoral Universities – Very high research activity". Northeastern faculty and alumni include Nobel Prize laureates, Rhodes, Truman, Marshall, and Churchill scholars. Undergraduate admission to the university is categorized as "most selective."

Northeastern features a cooperative education program, more commonly known as "co-op," that integrates classroom study with professional experience and includes over 3,100 partners across all seven continents. The program has been a key part of Northeastern's curriculum of experiential learning for more than a hundred years and is one of the largest co-op/internship programs in the world. While not required for all academic disciplines, participation is nearly universal among undergraduate students. Northeastern also has a comprehensive study abroad program that spans more than 170 universities and colleges.

Northeastern is a large, highly residential university. Most undergraduate students choose to live on campus but third-years and above have the option to live off campus. Seventy-eight percent of Northeastern students receive some form of financial aid. In the 2020–21 school year, the university has committed $355 million in grant and scholarship assistance. In 2019, Northeastern's six-year graduation rate was 89 percent.

The university's sports teams, the Northeastern Huskies, compete in NCAA Division I as members of the Colonial Athletic Association (CAA) in 18 varsity sports. The men's and women's hockey teams compete in Hockey East, while the men's and women's rowing teams compete in the Eastern Association of Rowing Colleges (EARC) and Eastern Association of Women's Rowing Colleges (EAWRC), respectively. Men's Track and Field won the CAA back to back years in 2015 and 2016. In 2013, men's basketball won its first CAA regular season championship, men's soccer won the CAA title for the first time, and women's ice hockey won a record 16th Beanpot championship. The Northeastern men's hockey team won the 2018, 2019, 2020, and 2023 Beanpot, defeating Boston University, Boston College, and Harvard.

History

Early development 

In May 1896, directors of the Boston Young Men's Christian Association, the first in the U.S., established an Evening Institute for Younger Men, to merge, coordinate and improve its classes that had evolved over the past 40 years. Included among roughly 30 courses offered were algebra, bookkeeping, literature, French, German, Latin, geography, electricity, music, penmanship and physiology. In addition, a banjo club, camera club, orchestra, and weekly parliamentary debates and discussions were promoted. A good education for "any young man of moral character" with a YMCA membership was promised. Located in a new headquarters building at the corner of Boylston and Berkeley streets in Boston, the institute held its first classes in 1898. After a fire, a new YMCA building was constructed on Huntington Avenue in 1913.

The School of Law was also formally established in 1898 with the assistance of an advisory committee, consisting of James Barr Ames, dean of the Harvard Law School; Samuel Bennett, dean of the Boston University School of Law; and Judge James R. Dunbar. In 1903, the first Automobile Engineering School in the country was established, followed by a Polytechnic School in 1904 and a School of Commerce and Finance in 1907. Day classes began in 1909. In 1916, a bill was introduced into the Massachusetts Legislature to incorporate the institute as Northeastern College. After considerable debate and investigation, it was passed in March 1916.

In 1909, the Polytechnic School began offering co-operative engineering courses to eight students. A four-year daytime program had been established consisting of alternating single weeks of classroom instruction and practical work experience with mostly railroad companies that agreed to accept student workers. In 1920, the Co-operative School of Engineering, which later became the College of Engineering, was first authorized to grant degrees in civil, chemical, electrical and mechanical engineering. The cooperative program, the second of its kind in the U.S. after one in Cincinnati, Ohio, was eventually adopted by all departments.

On March 30, 1917, veteran educator Frank Palmer Speare, who had served as director of the institute, was inaugurated as the first president of the newly incorporated Northeastern College. Five years later the college changed its name to Northeastern University to better reflect the increasing depth of its instruction. In March 1923, the university secured general (A.B. and B.S.) degree-granting power from the Legislature, with the exception of the medical and dental degrees.

The College of Liberal Arts was added in 1935. Two years later the Northeastern University Corporation was established, with a board of trustees composed of 31 university members and 8 from the YMCA. Following World War II, Northeastern began admitting women. In 1948, Northeastern separated itself completely from the YMCA. By 1959, when Carl Ell who had expanded the university stepped down as president, Northeastern had a local identity as an independent technical university serving a commuter and adult population.

That reputation began changing during the presidency of Asa S. Knowles, from 1959 to 1975. Facing a postwar educational boom, the university broadened undergraduate offerings, increased graduate offerings, modernized administrative and faculty structures, created a Faculty Senate, launched its first-ever capital campaign, reorganized and expanded adult and continuing education, and increased the number of colleges. The university created the College of Education (1953), University College (1960), now called the College of Professional Studies, and the colleges of Pharmacy and Nursing (1964), which both later merged into the Bouvé College of Health Sciences. The creation of the College of Criminal Justice (1967) followed, and then the Khoury College of Computer Sciences (1982), the first college in the United States dedicated to the field of computer science.

The period between 1959 and 1975, is also often described generally as "The Age of Student Unrest" or "The Student Revolution," when campuses across the United States were rocked with dissension against institutional discrimination and the Vietnam War. Northeastern's student population not only grew considerably larger, but also more diverse during this time. At the beginning of this period, most of the student body was composed of white males from New England, the majority of whom came from the Boston-area public schools and primarily studied business or engineering. By 1974–75, women accounted for 33 percent of the nearly 14,000 undergraduates students, while 5 percent were black. Moreover, over 900 students came from different foreign countries. Of the graduating class of 2,238, 513 were in Liberal Arts, 462 in Engineering, 389 in Business, 227 in Pharmacy and Allied Health, and the remainder were roughly divided among Education, Boston-Bouvé, Nursing and Criminal Justice.

To attract more women, the university refurbished existing facilities, constructed new women's dormitories and encouraged their participation in all programs. The merger with Boston-Bouvé, a women's college dedicated to physical health, and the creation of the College of Nursing, traditionally a female profession, also contributed to the increase. Though there was an explicit nondiscrimination policy on the books, throughout its history Northeastern had only a handful of black students. In the early 1960s, with financial assistance from the Ford Foundation in New York in the form of scholarships and co-ops to black high school students, Northeastern began actively recruiting black students. By 1975, black student-led organizations included the Afro-photo Society, Student Grill, Health Careers Club, The Onyx (a black student newspaper), Muhindi Literary Guild, the Outing Club, Black Engineering Society, and the first recognized black fraternity at the university, the Omicron Chapter of Iota Phi Theta. In addition, the number of foreign students increased from 170 in the 1950s and 1960s to 960 by 1974–75.

Recent history 
 
By the early 1980s, under President Kenneth G. Ryder, the one-time night commuter school had grown into one of the largest private universities in the nation at around 50,000 students. In 1990, the first class with more live-on campus rather than commuter students was graduated. After Ryder's retirement in 1989, the university adopted a slow and more thoughtful approach to change. Following an economic downturn, a 1991 Trustee committee report described the situation as "life threatening to Northeastern," warning of a $17 million budget gap with no funding mechanisms to cover it. That year President John A. Curry formulated a new strategy of transforming Northeastern into a "smaller, leaner, better place to work and study," describing unacceptable compromises in the quality and reputation of the university that had been made in the quest for more students. Staff were terminated and admissions targets were reduced, with applicant numbers beginning to rise by the end of Curry's tenure.

When Curry left office in 1996, the university population had been systematically reduced to about 25,000. Incoming President Richard M. Freeland decided to focus on recruiting the type of students who were already graduating as the school's prime demographic. Freeland focused on improving academics and restructuring the administration with a goal of "creating the country's premier program of practice oriented education". In the early 1990s, the university began a $485 million construction program that included residence halls, academic and research facilities, and athletic centers. During the university's transition, Freeland reorganized the co-operative education system, decentralizing it into a department based system to allow better integration of classroom learning with workplace experience. Full-time degree programs shifted from a four-quarter system to two traditional semesters and two summer "minimesters," allowing students to both delve more deeply into their academic courses and have longer and more substantive co-op placements, forcing departments to redesign aging programs to fit the longer format. Freeland also created a marketing department, uncommon for universities at the time, and expanded the university advancement office, while setting an ambitious $200 million fundraising target with the goal of reducing dependency on tuition.

Between 1995 and 2007, average SAT exam scores increased more than 200 points, retention rates rose dramatically, and applications doubled. In 1998, Freeland set an admissions target of 2,800 freshman per year, allowing for adequate tuition income without compromising on education. Throughout the transformation, his oft-repeated goal was to crack the top 100 of the U.S. News & World Report's rankings of America's best universities. With this accomplished by 2005, the transformation goal from commuting school to nationally recognized research university was complete. Freeland stepped down on August 15, 2006, and was followed by President Joseph E. Aoun, a former dean at the University of Southern California.

As part of a five-year, $75 million Academic Investment Plan that ran from 2004 to 2009, the university concentrated on undergraduate education, core graduate professional programs, and centers of research excellence. Faculty was originally to be bolstered by 100 new tenured and tenure-track professors, later expanded to include 300 additional tenure and tenure-track faculty in interdisciplinary fields. Aoun also placed more emphasis on improving community relations by reaching out to leaders of the neighborhoods surrounding the university. In addition, Aoun created more academic partnerships with other institutions in the Boston area, including Tufts University, Hebrew College and the School of the Museum of Fine Arts.

During this period, Northeastern rapidly advanced in national rankings. It placed 42nd in the 2014–15 edition of U.S. News & World Report'''s best colleges and universities rankings, a 7 position jump from 2013–14 and a 27 place gain since 2010–11. Critics have argued that Northeastern's rise in the rankings shows that the university has "cracked the code" to academic rankings, while others suggested it figured out how to "game the system." The 2021 edition of U.S. News & World Report ranked Northeastern 49th in its annual ranking of national universities. Whether or not the rise was an effort to reverse-engineer the controversial rankings formula, critics would likely agree that the positive feedback effect of its placement, in turn, allowed the institution to significantly increase its endowment, admit a more-competitive student body, hire new faculty, add to its campuses and expand its flagship co-op program.

The Empower Campaign was launched in May 2013 for student support, faculty advancement/expansion, innovation in education and research. Its goal was to raise $1 billion by 2017, with half of that being from philanthropic support and the other half from industry and government partnerships. The goal was raised to $1.25 billion in 2015. The campaign was inspired by Richard D'Amore and Alan McKim's $60 million donation to the university's business school in 2012. In October 2017, Northeastern revealed that the final total of the Empower campaign was $1.4 billion. More than 100,000 individuals and over 3,800 organizations donated to Empower, from 110 countries.

Presidents
Presidents of Northeastern University:
 Frank Palmer Speare (1898–1940)
 Carl Stephens Ell (1940–1959)
 Asa S. Knowles (1959–1975)
 Kenneth G. Ryder (1975–1989)
 John A. Curry (1989–1996)
 Richard M. Freeland (1996–2006)
 Joseph E. Aoun (2006–present)

Undergraduate admissions

For undergraduate students, Northeastern's 2022 acceptance rate was 6.7%. Of the record-large pool of 90,989 applicants, only 6,179 were admitted.  2020 acceptance rate was 18.1%. For the Class of 2024, Northeastern received 64,459 applications, with 13,199 students accepted. In 2018, the record number of applications led to a drop in acceptance rate, eight percentage points lower than the previous year. Additionally, Northeastern was one of the top ten most applied to colleges in 2018.

For the Class of 2022 (enrolling fall 2018), Northeastern received 62,272 applications, accepted 12,042 (19%), and enrolled 2,746. For the freshmen who enrolled, the middle 50% range of SAT scores was 670–750 for reading and writing, 690–790 for math, while the middle 50% range ACT composite range was 32–34.

Of those who applied in 2016, 9,500 were international students, up from 1,128 international applicants in 2006. Of those who enrolled, 20% were international students. In the Power of International Education's 2017 Open Doors report, Northeastern was ranked as the fourth-highest institution in the United States to host international students.

When it comes to both undergraduate and graduate students, the number of international students totals over 12,000 representing 138 different nations and over half of the student body. The number of international students at Northeastern has steadily increased by about 1,000 students every year since 2008.

Rankings

In the 2023 edition of U.S. News & World Report rankings, Northeastern was tied for 44th in the National Universities category.

Specialty rankings

 1st in "Best Co-ops/Internships"  (U.S. News & World Report) (2020, 2021, 2022, 2023)
 1st in "Best Schools for Internships" (Princeton Review) (2017, 2018)
 1st in "Best Internships/Career Services" (Princeton Review) (2008, 2009, 2010, 2011, 2013, 2014, 2015)
 2nd in "Best Graduate Psychology Programs" (2018)<ref name=USNWR_Grad>{{cite web |url=https://www.usnews.com/best-graduate-schools/northeastern-university-167358/overall-rankings |title=U.S. News Best Grad School Rankings |website=U.S. News & World Report |access-date=October 26, 2016 |archive-date=December 23, 2017 |archive-url=https://web.archive.org/web/20171223160825/https://www.usnews.com/best-graduate-schools/northeastern-university-167358/overall-rankings |url-status=live }}</ref>
 2nd in "Best Physician Assistant Programs" (2018)
 3rd in "Best Nursing-Anesthesia Programs" (2018)
 3rd in "Best Career Services" (Princeton Review) (2016, 2017, 2018)
 4th in "Top 25 Entrepreneurship: Ugrad" (Princeton Review) (2017, 2018) 
 4th in "Best Health Care Law Programs" (2018)
 6th in "Most Innovative Schools" (U.S. News & World Report) (2018) (up from 7th in 2017)
 7th in "The Top 25 B.A. Theatre Programs for 2018–19" (OnStage Blog)
 9th in "Best Undergraduate International Business Programs" (U.S. News & World Report) (2018)

Academics
Northeastern offers undergraduate majors in 65 departments. At the graduate level, there are about 125 programs. A Northeastern education is interdisciplinary and entrepreneurial. Founded in 2009, IDEA is Northeastern University's student-led Venture Accelerator, which provides entrepreneurs, including students, faculty, and alumni in the Northeastern community with the necessary support and educational experience towards developing a business from core concept to launch. Academics at Northeastern is grounded in a liberal arts education and the integration of classroom studies with experiential learning opportunities, including cooperative education, student research, service learning, and global experience, including study abroad and international co-op.

The university's cooperative education program places about 10,000 students annually in full-time, paid professional positions with more than 3,000 co-op employers in Boston and around the world. In 2014, College Prowler gave Northeastern an "A+" rating for the quality of classes, professors, and overall academic environment. Northeastern University is accredited by the New England Commission of Higher Education.

Colleges and schools
Colleges listed including schools and degrees offered:

 College of Arts, Media and Design (BA, BFA, BLA, BS, M.Arch., MA, M.Des., MFA, MS, Graduate Certificate)
 School of Architecture
 Department of Art + Design
 Department of Communication Studies
 Department of Media and Screen Studies
 Department of Music
 Department of Theatre
 Games at Northeastern
 School of Journalism
 D'Amore-McKim School of Business (BSBA, BSIB, BS, MBA, MS, MSA, MSF, MSIB, MSIM, MST, Graduate Certificate)
 School of Technological Entrepreneurship
 Khoury College of Computer Sciences (BACS, BS, BSCS, BSIS, MS, MSCS, MSIA, PhD, Graduate Certificate)
 College of Engineering (BS, BSBioE, BSCE, BSCHE, BSCompE, BSEE, BSIE, BSME, MS, MSBioE, MSCHE, MSCivE, MSCSE, MSECE, MSECEL, MSEM, MSENVE, MSIE, MSME, MSOR, MSSBS, MSTSM, PhD, Graduate Certificate)
 Department of Bioengineering
 Department of Chemical Engineering
 Department of Civil and Environmental Engineering
 Department of Electrical and Computer Engineering
 Department of Mechanical and Industrial Engineering
 Gordon Institute of Engineering Leadership
 Bouvé College of Health Sciences (AuD, BS, BSN, CAGS, DPN, DPT, MPH, MS, MSCP, PharmD, PhD, Graduate Certificate)
 Department of Applied Psychology
 Department of Communication Sciences and Disorders
 Department of Health Sciences
 Department of Physical Therapy, Movement and Rehabilitation Sciences
 The School of Nursing
 The School of Pharmacy
 College of Professional Studies (BS, BSET, DLP, DPT, EdD, MA, MAT, MEd, MPS, MS, MSLD, Graduate Certificate, Undergraduate Certificate)
 English Language Center
 School of Education
 Lowell Institute School
 School Health Institute
 World Languages Center
 College of Science (BA, BS, MS, MSOR, PhD, Graduate Certificate)
 Biochemistry Program
 Department of Biology
 Department of Chemistry and Chemical Biology
 Department of Marine and Environmental Sciences
 Department of Mathematics
 Department of Physics
 Department of Psychology
 Linguistics at Northeastern
 College of Social Science and Humanities (BA, Bachelor of Science, MA, MPA, MS, MSCJ, PhD, Graduate Certificate)
 Asian Studies Program
 ASL Program
 Department of African-American Studies
 Department of Economics
 Department of English
 Department of History
 Department of Languages, Literatures, and Cultures
 Department of Philosophy and Religion
 Department of Political Science
 Department of Sociology and Anthropology
 Human Services Program
 International Affairs Program
 Jewish Studies Program
 School of Criminology and Criminal Justice
 School of Public Policy and Urban Affairs
 School of Law (MS, JD)

Honors Program
The University Honors Program offers selected students an enhanced curriculum. These students are selected from the regular applicant pool with no separate application and represent the applicants with the highest GPA and SAT/ACT scores that year. The culminating experience is advanced specialty work in a major field through college-specific choices including specialized advanced honors seminars and an independent research project. In addition, students in the Honors Program exclusively can live in a Living-Learning Community housed in West Villages C and F. In Fall 2009, the university began housing first-year Honors students in the lower nine floors of the newly constructed International Village residence hall. Starting in Fall 2017, these students are housed in the lower floors of the even newer 17 story East Village residence hall. 2017 also marked the beginning of the Honors Discovery course and the introduction of the Student Assessed Integrated Learning (SAIL) app.

Co-op/internship program
Launched in 1909, Northeastern has one of the largest and oldest cooperative education (co-op) programs in the world. In the co-op program, students alternate periods of academic study with periods of professional employment (usually paid) related to their major. Students can choose to complete one or two co-op experiences to graduate in four years, or they can choose to complete three co-ops to graduate in five years. Students on co-op do not pay tuition and students not living on campus do not pay room and board. The co-op program typically begins the spring of the second year or fall of the third year (after a more traditional program for the first semesters on campus). Students usually take anywhere between one and three with 96% participating in one and 78% participating in two or more.

Co-op placements range from small start-up companies to large multinational companies, including many Fortune 500 corporations. The program also places students with government agencies, branches of government, nonprofits, and non-governmental organizations. Northeastern students can be found interning in the United States Congress, the White House, United Nations, and at NASA. Student placements usually last six months and most of the time, students are paid. Students may live in the university residence halls on campus during co-op employment, and the university currently leases housing for students co-oping in New York City, San Francisco, Seattle and Washington, D.C. and assists elsewhere.

Northeastern co-op students staying in Boston usually benefit from the fact that the city's most prominent industries have numerous offices/headquarters there. Boston's most consequential industries such as its financial sector, technology sector, and medicine/life sciences sector tend to hire many co-ops in these fields especially to big-name companies. When it comes to D'amore-Mckim Business students, many co-ops end up working for large financial firms such as State Street and John Hancock Financial. Accounting firms such as PricewaterhouseCoopers (PwC) and Deloitte & Touche as well as consulting firms such as Boston Consulting Group tend to hire many co-ops every cycle as well. Retail companies like TJX Companies and Staples tend to hire several marketing students every cycle.

Some students also decide to develop their own co-ops if they wish to do something that is not offered. This usually involves starting a new company or reaching out to a company Northeastern does not have a partnership with and facilitating the creation of a co-op partnership. Many companies continually pass down their co-op opportunities to Northeastern students so these new partnerships are documented in Northeastern's co-op database, known as NUCareers, to be given to future Northeastern students. Students that decide to start their own companies are usually involved with IDEA, Northeastern's Venture Accelerator, and will sometimes spend their entire two or three co-ops solely developing their companies. They might also join the Husky Startup Challenge which also helps develop student-run companies. If a company is successful in either IDEA, the Husky Startup Challenge or both, they often to move onto MassChallenge in Boston which is a huge global non-profit startup accelerator and competition.

All Northeastern students take at least one class which prepares them for their co-op and the expectations of a given industry. Some schools, such as D'Amore-McKim, have students take three different one-credit classes to prepare them for their co-op. During these classes, students work with advisers inside and outside of class to pursue potential co-ops as well as work on strategies to make themselves more competitive against other candidates.

The co-op program has led to the university's high reputation when it comes to job placement. 50% of Northeastern students receive a job offer from a previous co-op employer . 92% were either employed or enrolled in graduate school 9 months after graduation. This has also led Northeastern to consistently rank within the top 5 in the Princeton Review's list for "Best Career Services/Internships" within the last decade, mainly taking the top spot. The list split into "Best Career Services" and "Best Internships" in 2016 and Northeastern currently ranks 3rd for career services and 5th for internships in the United States.

Study abroad
Northeastern has semester-long study abroad programs with placements in Africa, Asia, Australia, Europe, and South America. Some participating schools include: University of Cambridge and London School of Economics, England; University of Edinburgh, Scotland; Reims Management School, France; European School of Business, Germany; University of Cape Town, South Africa; University of Auckland, New Zealand; Swinburne University of Technology, Australia; Obirin University, Japan; American College of Thessaloniki, Greece and Pontificia Universidad Católica de Chile, Chile and also Antarctica.

Northeastern's International Business program is a member of the International Partnership of Business Schools. Through this program International Business students have the opportunity to be awarded a dual-degree from Northeastern as well as from a sister school abroad.

Since the arrival of President Aoun in 2006, the school has also been emphasizing co-op abroad, in an effort to make the school more global and internationally engaged. There are many programs being offered including social entrepreneurship in the Peru, Kenya, and South Africa.

Dialogues of Civilizations 
Northeastern also has the notable Dialogues of Civilizations program, which features dozens of one-month-long programs (usually taking place in the summer) where a faculty member will teach a group of students in a region related to the curriculum of a specific class. A sort of "mini" study abroad, each program has an area of focus – for example, the Geneva program focuses on small arms and multilateral negotiations, while the South Africa program is based in non-governmental organizations, and the Seattle program focuses on design thinking. This program is meant to be a communicative experience and an exchange of ideas and cultures. It is open to all majors and all years, and is the most popular external study option at Northeastern.

The program is used by some Northeastern students to gain extra credits for a minor or concentration and can also be used by students trying to graduate in 4 years while also participating in one or more co-ops. The program will sometimes take place in multiple locations. Entrepreneurship and Global Consulting in Israel is a dialogue that starts in Boston and eventually has students go to Tel-Aviv and Beer Sheva, Israel. Some dialogues span multiple countries with one being taught in Marrakesh, Morocco, then in Amsterdam and concluding in Paris.

N.U.in 
Northeastern also offers a program called "N.U.in" which has first-year students start their first semester studying abroad. This program accepts students into the university but has them spend their first semester studying at a foreign university partnered with Northeastern. Students take classes and these credits transfer over to Northeastern when they arrive on campus in the spring. The program began in 2007 with the creation of N.U.in Australia and only had the option for students to go abroad during their fall semester. An option for freshman to go abroad in their spring was later added called "N.U.in Spring" and later renamed "Global Quest". By 2012, 500 students enrolled in the N.U.in program which at the time offered the destinations of London, Dublin, Thessaloniki (Greece), Sydney, and San José (Costa Rica). By 2017 that number grew to 1,100 students and the program had expanded to Shanghai, Rome, Berlin, Montreal, Melbourne, and removed San José as an N.U.in destination.

Research
Research Centers and Institutes at Northeastern include:

 Advanced Scientific Computation Center (ASCC)
 Anti–microbial Discovery Center
 Awareness and Localization of Explosives-Related Threats (ALERT)
 Barnett Institute of Chemical and Biological Analysis
 Bernard M. Gordon Center for Subsurface Sensing and Imaging Systems (Gordon-CenSSIS)
 Brudnick Center on Violence and Conflict
 Center for Communications and Digital Signal Processing (CDSP)
 Center for Community Health Education, Research, and Service (CCHERS)
 Center for Complex Network Research (CCNR)
 Center for Drug Discovery
 Center for Emerging Markets
 Center for Entrepreneurship Education
 Center for Family Business
 Center for Health Policy and Healthcare Research
 Center for Health Policy and Law
 Center for Healthcare Organizational Transformation (CHOT)
 Center for High-rate Nanomanufacturing (CHN)
 Center for Inclusive Computing
 Center for Integrative Biomedical Computing (CIBC)
 Center for Interdisciplinary Research on Complex Systems (CIRCS)
 Center for International Affairs and World Cultures
 Center for Law, Innovation, and Creativity (CLIC)
 Center for Microcontamination Control (CMC)
 Center for Microwave Magnetic Materials and Integrated Circuits (CM3IC)
 Center for Pharmaceutical Biotechnology and Nanomedicine
 Center for Public Interest Advocacy and Collaboration (CPIAC)
 Center for Research on Early Childhood Exposure and Development in Puerto Rico (CRECE)
 Center for Translational Applications of Nanoscale Multiferroic Systems (TANMS)
 Center for Translational NeuroImaging (CTNI)
 Center for Ultra-wide-area Resilient Electric Energy Transmission Networks (CURENT)
 Center on Crime and Community Resilience
 CMS Innovation Center for Healthcare Systems Engineering
 Coastal Sustainability Institute
 Cybersecurity and Privacy Institute
 Dukakis Center for Urban and Regional Policy
 Electronic Materials Research Institute (eMRI)
 Ethics Institute
 George J. Kostas Research Institute for Homeland Security
 Global Resilience Institute
 Humanities Center
 Institute for Chemical Imaging of Living Systems
 Institute for Global Innovation Management (IGIM)
 Institute for Health Equity and Social Justice Research
 Institute for Information Assurance
 Institute for Security and Public Policy
 Institute for the Wireless Internet of Things
 Institute on Race and Justice
 Interdisciplinary Science & Engineering Complex (ISEC)
 Marine Science Center
 National Education and Research Center for Outcomes Assessment in Healthcare (NERCOA)
 Network Science Institute
 New England Healthcare Systems Engineering Partnership (NEHCEP)
 New England Inflammation and Tissue Protection Institute
 Northeastern University Center for Renewable Energy Technology (NUCRET)
 NULab for Texts, Maps, and Networks
 Public Health Advocacy Institute (PHAI)
 Puerto Rico Testsite for Exploring Contamination Threats (PROTECT)
 Social Science Environmental Health Research Institute
 Sport in Society (previously the Center for the Study of Sport in Society)
 The Middle East Center
 The Northeastern Environmental Justice Research Collaborative (NEJRC)
 Versatile Onboard Traffic Embedded Roaming Sensors (VOTERS)

The university provides undergraduate students with an opportunity to engage in research through the Center for Experiential Education, CenSSIS Research Experience for Undergraduates,  Honors Research, Louis Stokes Alliance for Minority Participation program, and Provost's Office research grants. In FY 2007, annual external research funding exceeded $78 million. In FY 2009–10, the research funding is close to $82 million. In 2002, Northeastern's Center for Subsurface Sensing and Imaging Systems was designated an NSF Engineering Research Center. In 2004, Northeastern was one of six institutions selected by the National Science Foundation as a center for research in nanotechnology. In 2010, Northeastern was granted $12 million by an alum for a Homeland security research facility, to be named the George J. Kostas Research Institute for Homeland Security, after its chief benefactor.

Faculty

Northeastern had 1,352 full-time faculty, 95% of whom possess a doctorate or the terminal degree in their field, and 479 part-time faculty in Fall 2018. Northeastern faculty members direct more than 35 research and education centers, including a National Science Foundation (NSF) Engineering Research Center, an NSF Nanomanufacturing Center, and two NSF Integrated Graduate Education and Research Traineeship programs.

Campus 
Northeastern University's main campus is located on  mostly along Huntington Avenue and Columbus Avenue in an area known as the Fenway Cultural District, part of Boston's Fenway and Roxbury neighborhood, near the Museum of Fine Arts, Symphony Hall, New England Conservatory, and Christian Science Center.

Despite its location in central Boston, Northeastern is home to a significant amount of green open space and quads. Since the late 1990s, Northeastern has been considered a model of design for urban universities and has twice won the American Institute of Architects's "Most Beautiful New or Renovated Exterior Space" award in 2001 and 2004. In 2019, the campus was officially designated as an arboretum by ArbNet, making it the only campus in Boston to receive the designation.

The first baseball World Series took place on the Huntington Avenue Grounds, now part of the campus. The site is commemorated in front of Churchill Hall by a statue of Cy Young.

In 2014, Northeastern officially launched a Public Art Initiative to place a series of colorful murals and other art around the Boston campus. Among those whose work has been commissioned are French artist Jef Aérosol, Houston-born artist Daniel Anguilu, Los Angeles-based El Mac and Charleston, South Carolina-born artist Shepard Fairey, known for his 2008 Barack Obama "Hope" poster.

Campus development

During the Great Depression in the 1930s, as enrollment grew to over 4,600 students, President Frank Palmer Speare announced that Northeastern would build a new campus. Coolidge Shepley Bulfinch and Abbott, a Boston-based architectural firm, was selected to design the campus near the Huntington Avenue YMCA building that continued to house library and classroom spaces. Richards Hall, which housed classrooms, laboratories and administrative offices, was the first building completed in October 1938. Its light gray, glazed brick exterior with vertical strips of windows was replicated in other buildings of what later became known as the 1944 master plan. A mix of Beaux-Arts and Bauhaus architectural styles defined by stripped-down classicism and open courtyards that resembled that of Massachusetts Institute of Technology across the Charles River. In a June 14, 1934 article, the Boston Evening Transcript described the campus design as "modernistic classical." President Carl Ell completed the remaining buildings of the master plan, including construction of the Cabot Physical Education Center, Churchill Hall and Hayden Hall.

In 1961, under President Asa Knowles, the university purchased a 7-acre red brick industrial complex once owned by the United Drug Company to build to athletic facilities. Three of the buildings facing Forsyth Street were demolished, but due to a need for more office and lab space, the remaining buildings were divided into four sections now called Lake Hall, Holmes Hall, Nightingale Hall and Meserve Hall. The historic structure, built in 1911, would influence new campus buildings away from the original gray-brick campus, as exemplified by the extension of the law school's Cargill Hall in the early 1980s. Over past few decades, Northeastern's academic and residential buildings have expanded considerably. Through landscape improvements, the university transformed a commuter school campus, once dominated by asphalt, to a greener environment. For example, the Behrakis Health Sciences Center, named for 1957 pharmaceutical alumnus George Behrakis, is a  mixed-use project that included a residence hall and parking garage containing a garden roof, integrates smoothly into the campus. Centennial Path was added in 1996 and connects the gray- and red-brick sections of campus with trees, flowers, shrubbery and gently curving brick and asphalt surfaces.

During the last few years, major developments include Northeastern becoming recognized as an arboretum, opening a $225 million research and laboratory complex known as the Interdisciplinary Science and Engineering Complex (ISEC), launching the Institute for Experiential Artificial Intelligence with a $50 million donation, as well as renaming the College of Computer and Information Science to the Khoury College of Computer Sciences with another $50 million donation from Amin Khoury.

Upcoming projects include plans to build EXP, another research facility created to support Northeastern's work in autonomous vehicles, drones, and humanoid robots. This building will be approximately  larger than ISEC and is expected to be completed by 2023.

Sustainability

The 2011 Sustainable Endowments Institute's College Sustainability Report Card issued Northeastern a grade of "A−" for its environmental sustainability efforts and programs. Additionally, the Princeton Review rated Northeastern as one of the top 15 "Green Colleges" in the nation in 2010. In 2011, the GreenMetric World University ranking evaluated Northeastern as the second greenest university in the world, and first in the US. Northeastern placed first in the rankings again in 2014.

In accordance with a Boston zoning code amendment in 2007, International Village residence hall was certified as a LEED Gold building in 2010. Dockser Hall was the first building on campus to achieve LEED certification, also Gold, with the completion of its renovation in 2010. East Village was rated LEED Silver in 2016 and the Interdisciplinary Science and Engineering Complex was rated LEED Gold in 2018. The university affiliated LightView apartment building is targeting a LEED Platinum certification, the first in student housing in the City of Boston.

In 2004, Northeastern was awarded the prestigious gold medal by the Massachusetts Horticultural Society for its Dedham Campus.

Public safety

The Northeastern University Police Department (NUPD) is a full-service law enforcement agency with full powers of arrest on university property or property used by Northeastern students and faculty. In 2019 NUPD received Advanced Accreditation with Excellence from the Commission on Accreditation for Law Enforcement Agencies (CALEA), one of six agencies in Massachusetts to receive CALEA accreditation. The campus is adjacent to the Boston Police Department's headquarters. A 2008 Reader's Digest survey ranked NU as the second safest school in the United States after Johns Hopkins University in Maryland.

Public transportation
Northeastern is bracketed by the MBTA's Orange Line and Green Line E branch. Five stations serve the campus: Massachusetts Avenue and Ruggles on the Orange Line; and Symphony, Northeastern, and Museum of Fine Arts on the Green Line. The Green Line is paralleled by the #39 bus. Ruggles also serves the Needham, Providence/Stoughton, and Franklin Lines of the MBTA Commuter Rail system, and 14 local bus routes.

Landmarks

Krentzman Quadrangle
Facing Huntington Avenue, Krentzman Quadrangle is the main quadrangle on the campus of Northeastern. It is recognizable by the "Northeastern University" brick sign in front. The quad lies at the heart of the original campus between Ell, Dodge and Richards halls, and serves as a gathering space for community members and outdoor activities. It was named after Harvey Krentzman, a businessman and 1949 alumnus.

Ell Hall

Ell Hall, completed in 1947, is one of the oldest buildings on campus and is centered on Krentzman Quadrangle. It contains administrative offices, classrooms, art display space, a 992-seat auditorium and the Northeastern Bookstore. Like Dodge Hall, Ell Hall has five floors and also connects to the tunnel network. The tunnels interconnect the major administrative and traditional academic buildings for use in inclement weather.

Blackman Auditorium, Northeastern's largest event space, hosts many different types of events for classes, theater groups, dance teams, musical groups, choral groups, fraternities, sororities, and orchestral ensembles. Blackman has hosted many talented individuals from Maya Angelou to Seth Meyers.

Gallery 360 is Northeastern University's art gallery, which is free and open to the public throughout the year. The  space houses temporary exhibits of artworks by visiting artists, students, faculty, and the surrounding community. Some larger exhibits also include the adjacent hallways for additional space. Curation and administration is under the supervision of the College of Arts Media and Design (CAMD).

Ell Hall was named for Carl Ell, president of Northeastern from 1940 to 1959, who is credited with expanding the campus and making cooperative education an integral part of the university-wide curriculum.

Dodge Hall
Dodge Hall sits on Krentzman Quadrangle and primarily serves as the home of Northeastern's D'Amore-McKim School of Business. The building was completed in 1952 and named for Robert Gray Dodge, a former chairman of Northeastern's board of trustees. It has five floors. Classrooms and a lounge area occupy the first floor. The business school's undergraduate office is on the second floor and the graduate office is on the third floor. The School of Professional Accounting office is on the fourth floor. The basement houses a computer lab and is connected to the university's large network of tunnels.

From 1953 until Snell Library opened in 1990, Dodge Hall's basement served as the university's main library. Directly behind Dodge Hall is the Boston YMCA, where Northeastern was founded in 1898.

Richards Hall
Originally known as West Building, Richards Hall borders Krentzman Quadrangle and was the first building constructed on campus in October 1938. Its light gray brick and vertical window strips design was the work of alumnus Herman Voss and was replicated in other surrounding buildings. It is an administrative building with some academic space.

Richards Hall was named for Boston industrialist James Lorin Richards, a former board trustee.

Centennial Common
Centennial Common is a lawn created to mark the 100th anniversary of Northeastern University in 1998. The grassy area borders Shillman Hall, Ryder Hall, Meserve Hall, Leon Street, Forsyth Street and Ruggles Station, and serves as a gateway to the West Campus. The area is a popular gathering spot frequently used by students for recreational purposes and outdoor activities by student organizations.

Interdisciplinary Science & Engineering Complex

On February 21, 2014, Northeastern had its groundbreaking ceremony for the new Interdisciplinary Science & Engineering Complex (ISEC) on Columbus Avenue. Completed in 2017, the  building provides research and educational space for students and faculty from the College of Science, Bouvé College of Health Sciences, College of Engineering, and Khoury College of Computer Sciences. The centerpiece of the complex includes a large atrium, a spiral staircase, and a 280-seat auditorium.

Matthews Arena

Opened in 1910 and originally known as the Boston Arena, Matthews Arena is the world's oldest surviving indoor ice hockey arena. Located on the eastern edge of Northeastern University's campus, it is home to the Northeastern Huskies men's and women's hockey teams, and men's basketball team as well as the Wentworth Institute of Technology's men's hockey team. The arena is named after former university Board of Trustees Chairman George J. Matthews, a 1956 graduate, and his wife, the late Hope M. Matthews, who helped fund a major renovation in 1982. The arena is the original home of the NHL Boston Bruins and the WHA New England Whalers (now the NHL Carolina Hurricanes). It was also the secondary home to the NBA Boston Celtics in the 1940s. It has hosted all or part of the America East Conference men's basketball tournament a total of seven times and hosted the 1960 Frozen Four. The arena also served as the original home to the annual Beanpot tournament between Boston's four major college hockey programs.

Marino Recreation Center

The Marino Recreation Center, named after 1961 alumnus Roger Marino, co-founder of EMC Corporation, is an indoor fitness center that opened in the Fall of 1996.

Residential Halls 
Residential halls at Northeastern vary quite significantly from low-rise former Boston apartment buildings to purpose built high-rise dormitories. Residential halls vary in size from as few as 50 students to as many as 1,000 per building.

Traditional Accommodations
 Hastings Hall
 Kerr Hall
 Light Hall
 Melvin Hall
 Smith Hall
 Speare Hall
 Stetson East
 Stetson West
 White Hall

Suite-Style Accommodations
 153 Hemenway Street
 Kennedy Hall
 International Village
 East Village

Apartment-Style Accommodations
 Davenport Commons (A & B)
 West Villages (A, B, C, E, F, G, H)
 10 Coventry
 780 Columbus Ave
 106, 110, 116, 122 St Stephen St
 319, 337 & 407 Huntington Ave
 Burstein Hall
 Loftman Hall
 Rubenstein Hall
 Willis Hall
 144 Hemenway St
 Lightview

First-year students are usually divided into groups called Living Learning Communities (LLCs) which place students with certain majors, interests or hobbies together. LLCs host events related to specific areas of interest for members of that LLC to participate in. LLCs can span sections of floors in a residential hall, entire floors, multiple floors or entire buildings.

East Village
East Village is Northeastern's newest dorm building and only houses freshmen and upperclassmen who are in the University Honors Program. The building is located at 291 St. Botolph Street and opened in January 2015. Honors freshman live in its suite-style rooms whereas upperclassmen can choose full apartments with kitchen facilities. The building also contains 5 classrooms in the basement and an event space on the 17th Floor.

West Village

The West Village complex includes eight buildings serving mainly as residence halls and classrooms.
 Building A (opened 1999): Residence Hall (two sections, West Village A North and South).
 Building B (opened 2001): Residence Hall.
 Building C (opened 2001): Residence Hall (several floors for upperclassmen honors students) and one classroom.
 Building D – Behrakis Health Science Center (opened 2002): classrooms and laboratories
 Building E (opened 2002): Residence Hall.
 Building G (opened 2004): Residence Hall and several classrooms.
 Building H (opened 2004): Residence Hall. Open to students who are over the age of 21. Single rooms only. It's the new home of the Khoury College of Computer Sciences (several classrooms, offices and computer labs). Building H was originally reserved for honors student, but that rule was dropped.
 Building F (opened 2006): Residence Hall for upper-class students, classrooms, John D. O'Bryant African-American Institute, Admissions Visitors Center.

In 2008, West Village Building F was recognized in American Institute of Architects New England 2008 Merit Awards for Design Excellence.

South Campus (Columbus Avenue)
Northeastern's southernmost section of campus is located along Columbus Avenue in Roxbury, parallel to the Orange line. The university expanded south into Roxbury at the same time as they were building West Village. In 2001, Davenport Commons was opened, providing 585 students housing in two residence halls while 75 families representing a range of incomes have been able to purchase a condo or townhouse at or below Boston's market value. Davenport Commons also created commercial space on Tremont Street.

During the summer of 2006, Northeastern proposed a new residence hall further away from the main campus, at the corner of Tremont Street and Ruggles Street. Construction began in late February 2007. In the Spring of 2009, the complex was named International Village and opened later that Summer. It consists of three interconnected residential towers, an office tower, administration building, and a gym. A 400-seat dining hall is available to all members of the Northeastern community as well as the public.

Lightview was launched in 2019, which was Boston's first developer-led, equity-financed student housing project built and financed by American Campus Communities exclusively for Northeastern students. The building is 20 stories tall and includes a fitness area as well as social and recreational spaces.

The following buildings make up the South Campus:
Residential buildings
 Davenport Commons A – 2000
 Davenport Commons B – 2000
 780 Columbus Avenue – 2001 (converted lofts; formerly South End Auto Supply) 
 768 Columbus Avenue (faculty/graduate students)
 10 Coventry – 2005
 International Village – 2009
 LightView Apartments – 2019

Administrative buildings
 Columbus Place – 1997
 Renaissance Park 
 International Village Office Building – 2009
 Interdisciplinary Science and Engineering Building – 2017

Athletic buildings
 Badger and Rosen Facility (SquashBusters) – 2003

Library facilities
Northeastern University Libraries include the Snell Library and the John D. O'Bryant African-American Institute Library. The NU School of Law Library is separately administered by the NU School of Law.

The Snell Library opened in 1990 at a cost of $35 million, and contains 1.3 million volumes. The main library is open 24 hours a day, allowing students to research or study at any time they wish. The Digital Media Design Studio within the library is a collaborative and interdisciplinary learning environment for creating course-related multimedia presentations, projects, and portfolios.

The library is home to the Favat Collection, a current collection of children's literature and K-12 curriculum resources, instructional materials, and related information to support courses offered by the School of Education. It contains three computer labs operated by NU Information Services. Two are available to all NU students, faculty, and staff; the other is a teaching lab.

The Snell Library is also home to the Northeastern University Archives and Special Collections department, which includes the Benjamin LaGuer papers collection. The Special Collections focus on records of Boston-area community-based organizations that are concerned with social justice issues.

The NU Libraries received federal depository designation in 1963. As a selective depository, the Libraries receive 45% of the federal publication series available to depository libraries.

In June 2016, the library staff adopted an open-access policy to make its members' professional research publicly accessible online.

Dining Facilities

Northeastern features two dining halls with buffet-style offerings. These include the Levine Marketplace at Stetson East and International Village Dining at the International village residence hall on the southern portion of campus. Both halls allow students to gain access either by cashing in a meal pass stored on their Husky Card or purchasing access at the door using a credit card. Once inside, students are able to eat as much food as they please before leaving.

Spiritual Life Center and Sacred Space
Within the urban environment that characterizes the campus as a whole, NU has carved out a quiet, peaceful space in the centrally located Ell Building for the Spiritual Life Center's Sacred Space. The nondenominational Sacred Space, the center's main assembly hall, can be configured with carpets, mats or chairs. It has a distinctive ceiling consisting of 3 hanging domes made of overlapping aluminum tiles with an origami-like effect, warm wood floors and accents, and glass-paneled walls that lean outward slightly, their shape and material giving a sense of openness and volume to the space. Faucets for ablution are available in a flanking antechamber, and the center also contains a smaller meeting space and library. The Sacred Space opened in 1998. The architects Office dA (Nader Tehrani & Monica Ponce de Leon) received the 2002 Harleston Parker Medal from the Boston Society of Architects for the design.

Network campuses

In addition to Northeastern's main Boston campus, the university operates a number of satellite locations in Massachusetts, including the George J. Kostas Research Institute in Burlington, a Financial District campus in the Hilton Hotel near Faneuil Hall in downtown Boston, a Dedham Campus in Dedham, and a Marine Science Center in Nahant. The Kostas Research Institute for Homeland Security, which opened in 2011, contains the Laboratory for Structural Testing of Resilient and Sustainable Systems (STReSS Laboratory). The laboratory is "equipped to test full-scale and large-scale structural systems and materials to failure so as to explore the development of new strategies for designing, simulating, and sensing structural and infrastructure systems".

The university has also launched a number of full-service remote network campuses in North America, including in Charlotte, North Carolina, in October 2011, Seattle, in January 2013, San Jose, California, in March 2015, Toronto, in 2016 and Vancouver, British Columbia in 2019. In January 2020, Northeastern announced that it was opening the Roux Institute in Portland, Maine, a new research institute focused on artificial intelligence and machine learning in digital and life sciences. The decision came after Northeastern was selected for a $100 million donation by David Roux, in hopes of turning the city into a new tech hub and in an attempt to spark economic growth in the region.

More recently, the university has continued to focus on global expansion. In late 2018, Northeastern announced the acquisition of the New College of the Humanities, a small private London-based college founded by the philosopher A. C. Grayling. The move was seen as unorthodox as most U.S. colleges have typically chosen to build new campus branches abroad, rather than purchasing existing ones.

In June 2021, Northeastern and Mills College in Oakland, California, announced plans for a merger. Under the plans, the liberal arts college, which had financial troubles, was renamed Mills College at Northeastern University when the merger became effective on July 1, 2022.

Student organizations

Northeastern University offers students the opportunity to join various ethnic, cultural and political organizations, along with numerous honor societies, special interest groups, fraternities, and sororities. Northeastern has more than 16 varsity teams competing in the NCAA, over 30 club sports teams and over 400 student clubs and organizations. Among the student-run organizations are: Resident Student Association (RSA), Student Government Association (SGA), The Huntington News, Northeastern University Television (NUTV), Fraternity and Sorority Life (FSL), Social Justice Resource Center (SJRC), and the Council for University Programs (CUP) organize activities for Northeastern students as well as the surrounding community.

Northeastern hosts six student-run a cappella groups on campus: three mixed ensembles (Distilled Harmony, The Downbeats, and The Nor'easters), two treble ensembles (Pitch, Please! and Treble on Huntington), and one TTBB ensemble (UniSons). All groups regularly compete in the International Championship of Collegiate A Cappella (ICCA). The Nor'easters have performed at ICCA finals in New York City three times and won the ICCA title in 2013 and 2017. Pitch, Please! competed at ICCA finals in 2019. In 2020, The A Cappella Archive ranked The Nor'easters and Pitch, Please! at #3 and #22 out of all ICCA-competing groups.

Athletics

Since 1927, Northeastern University's intercollegiate athletic teams have been known as the Huskies. Prior to 1927, Northeastern had no official mascot. A committee was formed to choose a mascot and members eventually settled on the Siberian Husky. In February 1927, a pup was selected from legendary Iditarod Trail Sled Dog Race competitor Leonhard Seppala's kennel in Poland Springs, Maine. On March 4, 1927, King Husky I arrived at Northeastern in a campus celebration for which classes were canceled. Since then, live mascots have been a Siberian Husky breed, but after losing two mascots in three months in the early 1970s and after upheaval due to having live canine mascots, the university's administration was reluctant to continue the live mascot tradition. In 2005, the university resumed the live mascot tradition; the current live mascot is named Moses. The university's official costumed mascot is Paws.

The university's official colors are Northeastern red and black, with white often used as an alternate color. The university fight song, "All Hail, Northeastern," was composed by Charles A. Pethybridge, class of 1932. Since 2005, 14 of 18 Northeastern varsity sports teams primarily compete in NCAA Division I's Colonial Athletic Association (CAA). Northeastern maintains crosstown athletic rivalries primarily with Boston University, Harvard University and Boston College. It also regularly competes against in-state rival University of Massachusetts at Amherst.

During its first decades, Northeastern initially had seven athletics teams: basketball, cross country, indoor track, outdoor track, crew and football. It has since expanded to more than 16 varsity teams.

Northeastern sponsors the following sports teams:
 (M) Baseball
 (M), (W) Basketball
 (M), (W) Cross country
 (W) Field hockey
 (M), (W) Ice hockey (in Hockey East)
 (M), (W) Rowing (in Eastern Association of Rowing Colleges and Eastern Association of Women's Rowing Colleges)
 (M), (W) Soccer
 (W) Swimming and diving
 (M), (W) Track and field
 (W) Volleyball

The baseball, soccer, lacrosse and rugby teams compete at Parsons Field, a multipurpose facility located in Brookline, a mile and a half from the campus. The field's baseball diamond was named Friedman Diamond in 1988. Matthews Arena, which opened 1910, is home to the hockey and basketball programs. The 4,666-seat arena is located close to campus, just off Massachusetts Avenue. It is considered the world's oldest multi-purpose athletic building. Henderson Boathouse is home to the Huskies' men's & women's rowing squads. The Henderson Boathouse is located on the Charles River near Soldiers Field Road in Allston. The university also maintains the Cabot Physical Education Center, which opened in 1954 and includes a basketball court; an indoor track and natatorium; the  Gries Center for Sports Medicine and Performance Center; a squash facility; and the William E. Carter Playground, a renovated community park on Columbus Avenue.

The baseball team was founded in 1921 and has since competed in one College World Series and played in the NCAA regionals seven times. It regularly competes in the Baseball Beanpot, a tournament contested annually between Boston College, Boston University, Harvard University, Northeastern University and University of Massachusetts at Amherst. It has won the tournament six times.

The history of the men's basketball team dates back to its first season in 1920–21. In its first year in the CAA, the team finished in 6th place out of 12 teams and advanced to the semifinals of the conference tournament. The CAA proved to be a competitive conference in the 2006 NCAA basketball tournament, as George Mason University advanced to the Final Four. The women's basketball program began in 1966. In 2007, its second year in the CAA, the women's track team captured the conference championship, while the volleyball team finished second. The women's basketball team won 10 more games in 2008 than the previous year, the biggest one-year turnaround in the CAA, and advanced to the tournament quarterfinals.

The Northeastern crew team consistently ranks as one of the top 10 teams in the nation. In the 2008 National Championship, the team made the Grand Finals and placed fourth behind University of Wisconsin–Madison, University of Washington, and University of California, Berkeley, while defeating Brown University, Princeton University, University of Pennsylvania and Harvard University.

In 2009, Northeastern eliminated its 74-year-old football program. From 1933 to 2009, the Northeastern Huskies football program's all-time record was 290-365-17 (.444), it produced 20 All-Americans and won the 2002 Atlantic 10 Conference championship. Citing sparse attendance, numerous losing seasons and the expense to renovate Parsons Field to an acceptable standard, the university's Board of Trustees voted on November 20, 2009, to end the football program. According to President Joseph Aoun, "Leadership requires that we make these choices. This decision allows us to focus on our existing athletic programs."

In addition to intercollegiate athletics, Northeastern offers 40 club sports, including sailing, judo, rugby, lacrosse, Olympic-Style taekwondo, alpine skiing, squash, cycling, and ultimate Frisbee. In 2005 the women's rugby team finished third in the nation in Division II, while in the same year the men's rugby team won the largest annual tournament in the United States. Recently, the women's rugby team competed and placed 11th at the Collegiate Rugby Championship. The men's lacrosse team began the 2008 season ranked in the Top 10 nationally. The men's and women's squash team finished the 2008 season ranked in the Top 20 nationally. In the 2008–09 academic year the Northeastern Club Field Hockey and Women's Basketball teams won their respective National Championships. From 2007 to 2009, the Northeastern Club Baseball team won three straight New England Club Baseball Association championships. The Club Taekwondo team placed 1st overall in Division II for the 2018–19 Season in the Eastern Collegiate Taekwondo Conference.

On May 25, 2010, the club baseball team defeated Penn State to win the National Club Baseball Association Division II World Series and the national championship.

Some notable athletes have competed for Northeastern's athletic teams. Dan Ross played football at Northeastern long before setting the Super Bowl record for receptions in a game. Reggie Lewis still holds the men's basketball career scoring record. José Barea played point guard for the Huskies and averaged 21 points, 4.4 rebounds, 8.4 assists per game as a senior. Barea was signed by the Dallas Mavericks in 2006. Carlos Peña was named Major League Baseball's American League Comeback Player of the Year in 2007 and an AL Gold Glove winner in 2008. The U.S. Olympic women's ice hockey teams have included Northeastern alumni Shelley Looney and Chanda Gunn.

Ice hockey
Ice hockey has been one of Northeastern's most prominent athletic programs. The men's and women's hockey teams compete in the Hockey East conference. During the 2007–08 season, the men's team ranked as high at #7 in the country and held the top spot in the conference before finishing the season in sixth place in Hockey East. Both teams also participate in the annual ice hockey Beanpot tournament between the Boston area's four major college hockey schools. Northeastern's men's team has won the annual event 6 times in its 56-year history, while the women's team has captured the Beanpot 14 times. During the 2008–09 season, the men's team ranked as high as 3rd in the nation and held the top spot in Hockey East until the last weekend of the season; the team made the NCAA tournament for the first time since 1994, the Beanpot championship game for the first time since 2004, and goalie Brad Thiessen made the Hobey Hat Trick, only the second Northeastern player to do so. Northeastern won the 2018 Beanpot championship by defeating Boston College 3–0 in the first match and defeating Boston University 5–2 in the final match. The victory came after Northeastern attained the highest placement in the 2017–2018 standings of the Beanpot competitors. Northeastern defeated Boston College 4–2 to win the 2019 Beanpot and defeated Boston University 5–4 to win the 2020 Beanpot. In 2020, Northeastern beat Boston University 5–4 in overtime to win the Beanpot for the third year in a row.

The Beanpot also presents two awards to individual players. One is for the most valuable player and one is to the best goalie (determined by best save percentage). The second award is named the Eberly award after Glen and Dan Eberly who were goalies at Northeastern and Boston University. In addition to winning the Beanpot title, Northeastern took home both awards with the award for most valuable player being presented to Adam Gaudette and the Eberly Award being presented to Cayden Primeau who had a save percentage of .974 (making him the goalie with second highest save percentage to win the award in the 44 years the award has been given).

Traditions

Underwear ("Undie") Run 
Started in 2005, the Underwear Run is a Northeastern-sponsored event around fall midterm season in which students strip down to their underwear and run a track around campus and near parts of the city. The Northeastern University Police Department (NUPD) supervises the event to maintain the flow of traffic through the city. Students have described it as a "liberating experience" that "brings a sense of community and builds school spirit." Though the event was officially cancelled in 2020 and 2021 due to COVID-19 concerns, it was unofficially organized by students in fall of 2021.

Husky Hunt 
Organized by the Resident Student Association, Husky Hunt is a 24-hour city-wide scavenger hunt that has 50 teams of students roaming around the Greater Boston area in search of locations that correspond to clues, games, puzzles, and riddles. The scavenger hunt starts with a preliminary qualifying quiz of which only 1/3 of the total group of participating teams progress to the hunt. Prizes like iPads and Beats headphones are given to the highest scoring teams.

Notable alumni and faculty 

Northeastern University has more than 275,000 living alumni based in over 180 countries around the world. Many alumni have distinguished themselves in a wide range of endeavors. They include Nikesh Arora, former senior VP & Chief Business Officer of Google and CEO of Palo Alto Networks; activist short seller Andrew Left; professional basketball player José Juan Barea; former Kodak CEO Jeff Clarke; investigative journalist and Elmer Ferguson Memorial Award recipient Russ Conway; former Massachusetts U.S. Senator Mo Cowan; Saturday Night Live original cast member and actress Jane Curtin; marathon runner Beatie Deutsch; former United States Ambassador to Ireland Richard Egan; filmmaker, musician, and writer Michael J. Epstein; Napster  co-founder Shawn Fanning; 10th Archivist of the United States David Ferriero; musician and video game developer Toby Fox; musician John Geils; Webby Award-honored media producer Alan Catello Grazioso; electronic dance music producer RL Grime; New Hampshire governor and U.S. Senator Maggie Hassan; Massachusetts Governor-elect Maura Healey; Academy Award-nominated director and screenwriter Courtney Hunt; Space Shuttle Challenger astronaut Gregory Jarvis; fashion model and actress Beverly Johnson; Amin Khoury, founder of B/E Aerospace and CEO of KLX Energy Services Holdings; U.S. Olympian (bobsled) and silver medalist Steven Langton; University at Buffalo neurosurgery professor Elad Levy; professional basketball player Reggie Lewis; college president Thomas Michael McGovern; former NPR co-host of Car Talk Tom Magliozzi; actor David Marciano; EMC Corporation co-founder Roger Marino; CEO and Souq.com co-founder Ronaldo Mouchawar; comedian Patrice O'Neal; Washington, D.C. politician Oye Owolewa; billionaire businessman James Pallotta; computer scientist, and researcher Andrea Grimes Parker; former Rhode Island U.S. Senator and governor John O. Pastore; professional baseball player Carlos Peña; Boston Dynamics CEO and founder Marc Raibert; National Football League All-Pro Dan Ross; filmmaker Bettina Santo Domingo; Twitter co-founder Biz Stone; actor Vaughn Taylor; world champion surfer Shaun Tomson; television & radio talk show host Wendy Williams; and professional racing driver Reema Juffali.

Notable faculty
 Michael Dukakis, Former Governor of Massachusetts, Democratic Presidential Nominee in 1988, Professor of Political Science
 Matthias Felleisen, Author of How to Design Programs, Professor of Computer Science
 Mary Florentine, psychoacoustician, Matthews Distinguished Professor
 Pran Nath, co-developer of the theory of supergravity
Nada Sanders,  Distinguished Professor of Supply Chain Management at the D’Amore-McKim School of Business
 Susan Whitfield-Gabrieli, professor of psychology, Founding Director of the Biomedical Imaging Center

See also
 Boston Guild for the Hard of Hearing
 D'Amore-McKim School of Business
 Interdisciplinary Science and Engineering Complex
 Khoury College of Computer Sciences
 Northeastern University (MBTA station)
 Ruggles (MBTA station)
 South End Grounds
 Timeline of Boston

References

External links

 
 Northeastern University Athletics website

 
Educational institutions established in 1898
Universities and colleges in Boston
Private universities and colleges in Massachusetts
1898 establishments in Massachusetts
Universities and colleges founded by the YMCA